Christos Chomenidis (born 3 August 1966, Athens, Greece) is a Greek novelist. He studied Law at the University of Athens and in Moscow and Communication Studies in Leeds. He worked as a lawyer before becoming a full-time writer.
His book Νίκη won the 2021 European Book Prize in the Novel category.

Works

Novels
Το σοφό παιδί (The Wise Kid), 1993
Το ύψος των περιστάσεων (The Height of the Circumstances), 1995
Η φωνή (The Voice), 1998
Υπερσυντέλικος (Past Perfect), 2003
Το σπίτι και το κελλί (The House and the Cell), 2005
Λόγια-Φτερα (Words-Wings), 2009
Ο Κόσμος στα Μέτρα του (The World Tailored for him), 2012
Νίκη (Victory), 2014. In 2021, the French version was awarded the European Book Prize
Νεαρό άσπρο ελάφι (Young White Deer), 2016
Ο φοίνικας (The Phoenix), 2018

Short fiction
Δε θα σου κάνω το χατήρι (I Won't Do You the Favor), 1997
Δεύτερη ζωή (Second Life), 2000
Στη Δευτέρα Παρουσία ας μας βάλουν απουσία (During Advent, let them note us absent), 2010

External links
His entry for the 2001 Frankfurt Book Fair (Greek)
His books at Hestia and Patakis Publishers
His page at the website of the Hellenic Authors' Society (Greek)

Notes

1966 births
Living people
Writers from Athens
National and Kapodistrian University of Athens alumni
Greek novelists